Dypterygia pallida is a moth of the family Noctuidae first described by Paul Dognin in 1907. It is found in French Guiana, Paraguay and Guadeloupe.

External links

Hadeninae
Moths described in 1907